Nordvik is a village area in Vestland county, Norway. The village lies on a municipal border and is mostly located in Bergen Municipality, but the village extends over the border and does include land in neighboring Bjørnafjorden Municipality as well. In 2008, the population of the  Nordvik urban area was 429, of which 383 people live in Bergen and 46 lived in what is now Bjørnafjorden. The village is no longer considered an "urban area", so separate statistics are no longer tracked by Statistics Norway. The village are is now considered part of the Søvik urban area in Bjørnafjorden.

References

Villages in Vestland
Populated places in Bergen
Bjørnafjorden